Killian Sanson (born 7 June 1997) is a French professional footballer who plays as an attacking midfielder for Championnat National 2 club Bourges. He has previously played on the professional level with Evian and Montpellier. He is the younger brother of fellow professional footballer Morgan Sanson.

Club career
A youth product of Le Mans, Sanson joined Ligue 1 club Evian in 2013. He made his professional debut for Evian in 2015, in a 2–0 Ligue 2 defeat against Brest.

After Evian were relegated to the fourth-division due to financial issues, Sanson joined Montpellier in July 2016 where he signed his first professional contract, reuniting with his brother Morgan. He made his only Ligue 1 appearance for Montpellier on 20 May 2017, as a second-half substitute in the 2–0 defeat at Angers.

Sanson was loaned by Montpellier to Championnat National side Quevilly-Rouen at the start of the 2019–20 season. He was released by Montpellier at the end of the season, and after having a trial with Neuchâtel Xamax in Switzerland, he signed for the latest incarnation of football in Thonon-les-Bains, Thonon Evian.

References

External links

Killian Sanson foot-national.com Profile

1997 births
Living people
Association football midfielders
French footballers
Ligue 1 players
Ligue 2 players
Championnat National players
Championnat National 3 players
Le Mans FC players
Thonon Evian Grand Genève F.C. players
Montpellier HSC players
US Quevilly-Rouen Métropole players
Bourges Foot 18 players
Championnat National 2 players
Sportspeople from Cher (department)
Footballers from Centre-Val de Loire